The narrow escape problem is a ubiquitous problem in biology, biophysics and cellular biology.

The mathematical formulation is the following: a Brownian particle (ion, molecule, or protein) is confined to a bounded domain (a compartment or a cell) by a reflecting boundary, except for a small window through which it can escape. The narrow escape problem is that of calculating the mean escape time. This time diverges as the window shrinks, thus rendering the calculation a singular perturbation problem.

When escape is even more stringent due to severe geometrical restrictions at the place of escape, the narrow escape problem becomes the dire strait problem.

The narrow escape problem was proposed in the context of biology and biophysics by D. Holcman and Z. Schuss, and later on with A.Singer and led to the narrow escape theory in applied mathematics and computational biology.

Formulation 
The motion of a particle is described by the Smoluchowski limit of the Langevin equation:

Mean first passage time and the Fokker-Planck equation 

A common question is to estimate the mean sojourn time of a particle diffusing in a bounded domain  before it escapes through a small absorbing window  in its boundary . The time is estimated asymptotically in the limit 

The probability density function (pdf)  is the probability of finding the particle at position  at time .

The pdf satisfies the Fokker–Planck equation:

with initial condition

and mixed Dirichlet–Neumann boundary conditions

The function

represents the mean sojourn time of particle, conditioned on the initial position . It is the solution of the boundary value problem

The solution depends on the dimension of the domain. For a particle diffusing on a two-dimensional disk

where  is the surface of the domain. The function  does not depend on the initial position , except for a small boundary layer near the absorbing boundary due to the asymptotic form.

The first order term matters in dimension 2: for a circular disk of radius , the mean escape time of a particle starting in the center is

The escape time averaged with respect to a uniform initial distribution of the particle is given by

The geometry of the small opening can affect the escape time: if the absorbing window is located at a corner of angle , then:

More surprising, near a cusp in a two dimensional domain, the escape time  grows algebraically, rather than logarithmically: in the domain bounded between two tangent circles, the escape time is:

where  is the ratio of the radii. Finally, when the domain is an annulus, the escape time to a small opening located on the inner circle involves a second parameter which is  the ratio of the inner to the outer radii, the escape time, averaged with respect to a uniform initial distribution, is:

The case  close to 1 remains open, and for general domains, the asymptotic expansion of the escape time remains an open problem. So does the problem of computing the escape time near a cusp point in three-dimensional domains. For Brownian motion in a field of force  the gap in the spectrum is not necessarily small between the first and the second eigenvalues, depending on the relative size of the small hole and the force barriers, the particle has to overcome in order to escape. The escape stream is not necessarily Poissonian.

Analytical results

A theorem that relates the Brownian motion escape problem to a (deterministic) partial differential equation problem is the following.

Here  is the derivative in the direction , the exterior normal to  Moreover, the average of the variance can be calculated from the formula

The first part of the theorem is a classical result, while the average variance was proved in 2011 by Carey Caginalp and Xinfu Chen.

The escape time has been the subject of a number of studies using the small gate as an asymptotically small parameter. The following closed form result gives an exact solution that confirms these asymptotic formulae and extends them to gates that are not necessarily small.

Another set of results concerns the probability density of the location of exit.

Simulations of Brownian motion escape
In simulation there is a random error due to the statistical sampling process. This error can be limited by appealing to the central limit theorem and using a large number of samples. There is also a discretization error due to the finite size approximation of the step size in approximating the Brownian motion. One can then obtain empirical results as step size and gate size vary. Using the exact result quoted above for the particular case of the circle, it is possible to make a careful comparison of the exact solution with the numerical solution. This illuminates the distinction between finite steps and continuous diffusion. A distribution of exit locations was also obtained through simulations for this problem.

Biological applications

Stochastic chemical reactions in microdomains 
The forward rate of chemical reactions is the reciprocal of the narrow escape time, which generalizes the classical Smoluchowski formula for Brownian particles located in an infinite medium. A Markov description can be used to estimate the binding and unbinding to a small number of sites.

References

External links 
 Applied Mathematics and Computational Biology in Ecole Normale Superieure, Paris 
Carey Caginalp publications and lectures http://www.pitt.edu/~careycag/
Comptes Rendus paper http://www.pitt.edu/~careycag/paper1.pdf
 ARMA paper http://www.pitt.edu/~careycag/paper2.pdf

Diffusion
Mathematical and theoretical biology
Stochastic processes